Aloeides namibiensis, the Namibia copper, is a butterfly in the family Lycaenidae. It is found in Namibia. The habitat consists of arid savanna.

Adults have been recorded in December.

References

Butterflies described in 1994
Aloeides
Endemic fauna of Namibia
Butterflies of Africa